Husin Ahmad or sometimes spelled Hussin Ahmad, is a Bruneian soldier who served as the Commander of the Royal Brunei Armed Forces (RBAF) from 1994 until 1997.

Early life and education 
Husin is the son of Dayang Hajah Halimah bte Hussin and Awang Ahmad bin Mali. He was born on 11 July 1944 in Kampong Keriam, Tutong.

Military career 
Members of the Brunei Malay Army participated in a historic incident on October 8, 1966, when they searched for the North Kalimantan National Army group's remnants in the Temburong District's forested area. Junior lieutenants Musa Ya'akub and Husin Ahmad were given instructions to carry out the duty with their respective platoons. They, along with their company, have successfully arrested four rebels in Sungai Mani, Batang Duri, in the Temburong District jungle, using their unwavering perseverance and thorough military training.

On 17 September 1991, he would became the first local commander of the Royal Brunei Land Forces (RBLF). Husin would hold that position for an estimated 3 years before being succeeded by Shari Ahmad on 10 August 1994. Moreover, Major general Husin became the commander of the RBAF on 30 September 1994, and would held it until 29 September 1997.

Later life 
After his military career, he was the Brunei high commissioner to Amman, Jordan from 10 July 2001 to 8 May 2006. Husin Ahmad has the title of Pehin Datu Harimaupadang and has been assigned to the Additional Manteri 32 in the Legislative Council. Husin Ahmad, who serves as the Chairman of the Council's Supreme Committee, Ibnu Baa'sith Apong, and Mohammad Daud were present for the Sultan's departure from the Royal Berkshire Hall, Jerudong Polo Club on 1 August 2016.

Honours 

Pehin Dato Husin was awarded the title of Pehin Datu Harimau Padang by Sultan Hassanal Bolkiah on 3 March 1975. Examples of honours awarded to him;

  Order of Paduka Keberanian Laila Terbilang First Class (DPKT) – Dato Paduka Seri
  Order of Pahlawan Negara Brunei First Class (PSPNB) – Dato Seri Pahlawan
  Order of Paduka Seri Laila Jasa Second Class (DSLJ) – Dato Seri Laila Jasa
  Order of Perwira Agong Negara Brunei First Class (PANB) – (1966)
  Sultan Hassanal Bolkiah Medal (PHBS)
  Meritorious Service Medal (PJK)
  Silver Jubilee Medal – (5 October 1992)
  Royal Brunei Armed Forces Silver Jubilee Medal – (31 May 1986)
  General Service Medal
  Long Service Medal (Armed Forces)
  Proclamation of Independence Medal – (1 January 1984)

References 

1944 births
Living people
Bruneian Muslims
Ambassadors of Brunei
Ambassadors to Jordan
Bruneian military leaders